Episodic may refer to:

 The nature of television series that are divided into short programs known as episodes
 Episodic memory, types of memory that result from specific incidents in a lifetime
 In Geology, episodic refers to events that occur or have occurred periodically
 Episodic writing,  a publishing format by which a single large work is presented in contiguous (typically chronological) installments
 Episodic video game, a video game of a shorter length that is commercially released as an installment

See also